Cornel Durău (born 30 January 1957) is a retired Romanian handball player. Between 1976 and 1990 he played 200 games for the national team and scored 435 goals. He competed at the 1980 and 1984 Olympics and a three world championships, and won three bronze medals. At the club level he played for Dinamo Bucharest, Hidrotehnica Constanța and CB Torrevieja before finishing his career in Germany.

References

External links 
 
 
 

1957 births
Living people
Romanian male handball players
People from Dolj County
CS Dinamo București (men's handball) players
Handball players at the 1980 Summer Olympics
Handball players at the 1984 Summer Olympics
Olympic handball players of Romania
Olympic bronze medalists for Romania
Olympic medalists in handball
Medalists at the 1984 Summer Olympics
Medalists at the 1980 Summer Olympics